Oropus is a genus of ant-loving beetles in the family Staphylinidae. There are at least 20 described species in Oropus.

Species
These 29 species belong to the genus Oropus:

References

Further reading

 
 
 
 
 
 
 
 
 
 

Pselaphinae
Articles created by Qbugbot